The Veracruz State League was a winter baseball league established in 2016. The league was composed of four teams, all in the Mexican state of Veracruz.

Teams

Champions

Liga Veracruzana Estatal de Béisbol Championships by team

Defunct teams

Arroceros de Tierra Blanca

See also
Mexican baseball awards

References

External links
Official website

Defunct baseball leagues in Mexico
Winter baseball leagues
Sports leagues established in 2005
 
Professional sports leagues in Mexico